Step Up is a 2006 American teen romantic dance drama film directed by Anne Fletcher (in her directorial debut) from a screenplay by Duane Adler and Melissa Rosenberg and a story by Adler. The film stars Channing Tatum, Jenna Dewan, Mario, Drew Sidora, Damaine Radcliff, and Rachel Griffiths.

Set in Baltimore, Maryland, the film follows the tale of the disadvantaged Tyler Gage (Tatum) and the privileged modern dancer Nora Clark (Dewan), who find themselves paired up in a showcase that determines both of their futures. Realizing that they only have one chance, they finally work together.

Step Up was released by Touchstone Pictures and Summit Entertainment in the United States on August 11, 2006. The film received mostly negative reviews from critics, but became a box office success, grossing $114.2 million worldwide against a budget of $12 million. It spawned a franchise that includes four sequels and a television series.

Plot
Brothers Mac (Radcliff) and Skinny Carter and their best friend Tyler Gage (Tatum) attend a party where they have a fight with their nemesis, PJ. P.J. is involved in car thefts around the city, and Tyler, Mac, and Skinny, have also gotten involved in the crimes. Following the party, the trio break into the Maryland School of Arts and trash the theatre. When a security guard appears, Tyler helps the two escape, accepting full blame for the vandalism himself.

Tyler is sentenced to 200 hours of community service at the school. He works as a custodian, doing everything from mopping to changing light bulbs. While putting in his hours, he watches Nora Clark's (Dewan) dance class preparing for her "senior showcase", an audition performance which will determine if she gets a position with an attending professional dance company.

When Mac and Skinny visit Tyler on the school's lot, Nora watches from a window as Tyler dances with his friends, mockingly a mashup of breakdance and the moves he recently observed. When Andrew, her dance partner sprains an ankle, she finds herself without a partner for her routine.

Auditioning sophomores to replace him, none meet her expectations. Tyler offers to help, but Nora initially refuses. After proving he can handle the routine, she reconsiders, convincing Director Gordon to let him rehearse with her. Initially they clash, but as rehearsals continue they grow closer and learn from each other. Tyler also befriends Miles (Mario), a music student with a crush on Nora's friend, Lucy (Sidora).

Nora's bond with Tyler grows, and one day she takes him to a special spot on the waterfront where she first envisioned her routine. She had always imagined it as an ensemble dance, rather than a duet. Tyler is inspired to help her dream come true, recruiting younger dancers from the school to perform in her number. Brett signs a recording deal with a company, betraying Miles for the opportunity. Disgusted, Nora breaks up with him. Meanwhile, Tyler continues to try to balance his new goals, new friends, and nurturing a troubled relationship with his old ones.

Tyler asks Director Gordon if she will admit him into the school, and is told he must prove he deserves a chance. Nora suggests using the showcase also as his entrance audition. After dancing together at a club where Miles and Lucy perform, Tyler and Nora finally kiss. Rehearsals continue until Andrew returns, seemingly healed from his injury. Feeling angry and no longer needed, Tyler accuses Nora of using him like Brett treated Miles. Leaving the group he returns to his janitorial work.

However, as the choreography is now much too difficult for Andrew, he falls, pulling himself from the routine. Again without a partner, crushed, she considers abandoning her dance career for college after all. Her mother's encouragement inspires her to rewrite the choreography without a partner.

Later during a party night at Omar's, Skinny comes by against his mother's insistence he stay at home and gets kicked out by Mac and Tyler. Frustrated, Skinny walks back home in a huff before spotting PJ arriving at a store with his friend. Skinny steals PJ's unattended car and foolishly drives back to Omar's, wanting to hang out with the girls. Mac and Tyler are trying to get Skinny to abandon the car when PJ and his friends arrive and fatally shoot Skinny. A few days after Skinny's funeral, Mac and Tyler both realize that they need to make better life decisions.

Tyler shows up at the last minute on the evening of the showcase. He tries to persuade Nora to let him perform with them, and to forgive him. Initially declining, she suddenly changes her mind as Tyler wishes her luck and walks away. When the curtain opens, the whole ensemble performs the original choreography with Miles' latest musical score. The crowd is blown away.

Backstage, a proud Director Gordon introduces Nora to a director of a professional dance company, hoping to sign Nora. Meanwhile, Mac congratulates Tyler for his performance. Thereafter, Director Gordon introduces Tyler as a "transfer." Nora is elated and embraces him. Repeating her original advice that he'll need to get some tights, the movie ends with them sharing a kiss.

Cast

 Channing Tatum as Tyler Gage, a lower class hip hop dancer and Camille's foster brother who vandalizes MSA and is sentenced to community service by washing the school's windows. Tyler eventually falls in love with Nora. 
 Jenna Dewan as Nora Clark, a ballet dancer who wants to be a professional dancer. Nora's father died prior to the events of the movie.
 Mario as Miles Darby, Nora's other best friend who is a talented DJ. Miles was previously lower class just like Tyler. Miles now lives with his aunt.
 Drew Sidora as Lucille "Lucy" Avila, Nora's best friend who loves to sing and is in a relationship with a college student named Colin. Lucy encourages Nora to follow her dream of being a professional dancer.
 Damaine Radcliff as Marcus "Mac" Carter, Tyler's best friend and Skinny's older brother
 De'Shawn Washington as Skinny Carter, Mac's younger brother who dies from his injuries and blood loss after being shot.
 Alyson Stoner as Camille, Tyler's foster sister and also a talented hip hop dancer
 Rachel Griffiths as Director Gordon, the no nonsense director of Maryland School of Arts
 Josh Henderson as Brett Dolan, Nora's ex-boyfriend who wants to be a singer
 Heavy D as Omar, a shady car dealer
 Deirdre Lovejoy as Katherine Clark, Nora's widowed mother who doesn't approve of dance. Katherine doesn't think that dance is a practical career for Nora. Katherine wants Nora to move on from dance and go to college so she can pursue a practical career. Katherine is afraid that Nora will get hurt by pursuing a career in dance. 
 Jamie Scott as Colin, Lucy's college aged boyfriend

Actors Channing Tatum and Jenna Dewan met while filming Step Up and began dating shortly after it was completed; they married in 2009. In 2013, they had their first daughter, Everly Elizabeth Maiselle Tatum. In 2018, they announced they were separating.

Reception

Box office
Step Up earned a total of $21 million in its opening weekend, ranking second in the North American box office. It earned $65.3 million in the United States and Canada by its last day in theaters on October 19, 2006.  The film's budget was $12 million.

Critical response
On Rotten Tomatoes, the film has an approval rating of 21% based on reviews from 108 critics, with an average rating of 4.60/10. The website's consensus states that "this trite teen romance has too little plot and not enough dancing". On Metacritic the film has a weighted average score of 48/100 based on reviews from 23 critics, indicating "mixed or average reviews"; its highest score was 75 (from both Entertainment Weekly and The Boston Globe), and its lowest was a 25 from the San Francisco Chronicle. Audiences polled by CinemaScore gave the film a grade A−.

Home media
The film was released on DVD on December 19, 2006.

Soundtrack

The soundtrack features music from Mario, Drew Sidora, Ciara, Chamillionaire, Kelis, Chris Brown, Within Temptation's Sharon Den Adel, Blaire Reinhard, Yung Joc and 3LW. J-pop singer Koda Kumi's 35th single But/Aishō was used as a theme song for the Japanese edition of the movie.

The lead singles from the soundtrack are Sean Paul & Keyshia Cole's "(When You Gonna) Give It Up To Me", Chris Brown's "Say Goodbye", and Ciara single, "Get Up"  featuring Chamillionaire. It was released August 8. Other tracks include Kelis' "80s Joint", Anthony Hamilton's "Dear Life", YoungBloodZ's "Imma Shine" and Petey Pablo's "Show Me The Money". The title track was performed by future X Factor Australia winner Samantha Jade and produced by Wyclef Jean.

References

External links

 
 
 
 
 

2006 films
2000s dance films
2006 romantic drama films
2000s romantic musical films
2000s teen drama films
2000s teen romance films
American dance films
American musical drama films
American romantic drama films
American romantic musical films
American teen drama films
American teen musical films
American teen romance films
2000s English-language films
Films directed by Anne Fletcher
Films scored by Aaron Zigman
Films set in Baltimore
Films shot in Baltimore
2000s hip hop films
Films with screenplays by Melissa Rosenberg
Step Up (film series)
Summit Entertainment films
2006 directorial debut films
Touchstone Pictures films
2000s American films